690 Wratislavia is a minor planet orbiting the Sun.  Wratislavia was discovered on October 16, 1909.  IRAS data shows it is about 135 km in diameter.

Wratislavia has been studied by radar.

References

External links 
 Discovery Circumstances: Numbered Minor Planets (1)-(5000) Minor Planet Center
 Rotational Period Determination of 690 Wratislavia
 
 

Background asteroids
Wratislavia
Wratislavia
CPF-type asteroids (Tholen)
19091016